Rivière-Bonaventure is an unorganized territory in the Gaspésie–Îles-de-la-Madeleine region of Quebec, Canada.

Demographics

Population

Private dwellings occupied by usual residents: 36 (total dwellings: 87)

See also
 List of unorganized territories in Quebec

References

Unorganized territories in Gaspésie-Îles-de-la-Madeleine